João Pedro Galvão De Carvalho (born 7 May 2001), known as JP Galvão or simply João Pedro, is a Brazilian footballer who plays as a midfielder for Botafogo.

Club career
Born in Rio de Janeiro, Galvão joined Vasco da Gama in 2019 from Tigres do Brasil. He renewed his contract with Vasco in February 2021. In April 2022, he was loaned to Série A side Botafogo until November of the same year, with the option to make the deal permanent.

In January 2023, Galvão signed a two-year deal with Botafogo.

International career
Galvão was called up to the Brazil national under-23 football team for training camps ahead of the 2020 Summer Olympics in Japan.

Career statistics

Club

Notes

References

2001 births
Living people
Footballers from Rio de Janeiro (city)
Brazilian footballers
Association football fullbacks
Association football midfielders
CR Vasco da Gama players
Botafogo de Futebol e Regatas players